St Dennis Association Football Club is a football club based in St Dennis, Cornwall.

History
Founder members of the Cornwall Combination in 1959–60, St Dennis won the league in 1975–76, before dropping out in 1983. They resurfaced in the East Cornwall League and won it twice, in 1991–92 and 1999–2000. They resigned in 2006, but rejoined three years later, winning Division One and the Premier Division in two seasons before being promoted to the South West Peninsula League Division One West in 2011. At the end of 2018–19 the league was restructured, and St Dennis successfully applied for promotion to the Premier Division West, at Step 6 of the National League System.

Honours
Cornwall Combination
Champions 1975–76
East Cornwall League
Champions 1991–92, 1999–2000, 2010–11

References

Association football clubs established in 1986
1986 establishments in England
Football clubs in England
Football clubs in Cornwall
South West Peninsula League